Hammy may refer to: 
Hammy, a hyperactive squirrel character in the comic strip and film Over the Hedge
Hammy Baker (1893-1937), Canadian ice hockey player
Hammy Gillespie (1898-1973), Canadian professional ice hockey player
Hammy Love (1895-1969), Australian cricketer
Hammy McMillan (born 1963), Scottish curler
Hammy McMillan Jr. (born 1992), Scottish curler
Hammy Down Versace (born 1985), American rapper
Slang for Hamstring
Overacting, of acting